Moni, as given by Ekari people, or Migani/Megani, as given by locals, also known as Djonggunu, Jonggunu, is a Papuan language spoken by about 20,000 people (1991) in the Paniai lakes region of the Indonesian province of Central Papua. Majority of Moni language speakers live in Kemandoga valley. Awembak (Awembiak) is a dialect.

References

Bibliography 
 

Paniai Lakes languages